This is a list of past and present members of the Senate of Canada representing the province of Quebec.

Quebec has 24 permanent Senate divisions that are fixed under section 22 of the Constitution Act, 1867, which provides that "In the Case of Quebec each of the Twenty-four Senators representing that Province shall be appointed for One of the Twenty-four Electoral Divisions of Lower Canada..." Lower Canada (later the eastern portion of the Province of Canada) was Quebec's predecessor colony.

In addition to the other qualifications for appointment to the Senate, a Quebec senator must, in accordance with subsection 23(5) of the Constitution Act, 1867, "have his Real Property Qualification in the Electoral Division for which he is appointed, or shall be resident in that Division". In other words, the senator must either live in his or her division or own an immovable in the division worth at least $4,000 on a net basis. The Quebec senator must continue to meet this qualification to remain in office under subsection 31(5) of the Constitution Act, 1867.

In other provinces, although senators can designate their own divisions within the province they represent, those designations do not have legal significance.

Current Quebec senators

1 Senators are appointed by the Governor-General of Canada on the recommendation of the prime minister listed.

Members by Senate division
The boundaries for all Quebec districts are mandated in the Constitution Act 1867 and cannot change without a constitutional amendment. The boundaries are described in the 1859 Consolidated Statutes of Canada.

Self-designated Senate divisions can be used by senators appointed under the Regional Expansion Clause Section 26 of the Constitution Act 1867. This clause can be used to increase the Senate seats by one or two senators for each region (Ontario, Quebec, the Maritimes and the Western Provinces). Prime Minister Brian Mulroney is the only one to use this clause, on September 27, 1990.

Self-designated
These senators were appointed under a constitutional provision that allowed the number of Quebec senators to temporarily increase by one or two. As such, these senators belonged to no constitutionally-mandated division, and could designate one of their choosing.

Alma

The Alma Senate division is defined in the Consolidated Statutes of Canada (1859) as "The Parishes of Long Point, Pointe-aux-Trembles, Rivière des Prairies, Sault aux Récollets, in the county of Hochelaga, and that part of the Parish of Montreal which lies to the East of the prolongation of St. Denis Street; the County of Laval, that part of the City of Montreal which lies to the East of Bonsécours and St. Denis Streets, and their prolongation."

Bedford

The Bedford Senate division is defined in the Consolidated Statutes of Canada (1859) as "The Counties of Missisquoi, Brome, and Shefford."

De la Durantaye

The De la Durantaye Senate division is defined in the Consolidated Statutes of Canada (1859) as "The remainder of the County of L'Islet, the countie[s] of Montmagny and Bellechasse and the Parishes of St. Joseph, St. Henri and Notre Dame de la Victoire, in the County of Lévi." The demarcation of the Grandville Senate division provides an explanation of what constitutes the "remainder of the County of L'Islet".

De la Vallière

The De la Vallière Senate division is defined in the Consolidated Statutes of Canada (1859) as "The Counties of Nicolet and Yamaska, the Townships of Wendover, Grantham, and the part of Upton which lies in the County of Drummond."

De Lanaudière

The De Lanaudière Senate division is defined in the Consolidated Statutes of Canada (1859) as "The remainder of the County of Maskinongé, the Counties of Berthier and Joliette, with the exception of the Parish of St. Paul, the Township of Kidldare and its augmentation, and the Township of Cathcart". The demarcation of the Shawinigan Senate division provides an explanation of what constitutes the "remainder of the County of Maskinongé".

De Lorimier

The De Lorimier Senate division is defined in the Consolidated Statutes of Canada (1859) as "The Counties of St. John and Napierville; St. Jean Chrysostôme and Russeltown in the County of Chateauguay; Hemmingford in the County of Huntingdon."

De Salaberry

The De Salaberry Senate division is defined in the Consolidated Statutes of Canada (1859) as "The remainder of the County of Chateauguay, the remainder of the County of Huntingdon, and the County of Beauharnois." The demarcation of the De Lorimier Senate division provides an explanation of which parishes are excluded from the De Salaberry Senate division.

Grandville

The Grandville Senate division is defined in the Consolidated Statutes of Canada (1859) as "The Counties of Temiscouata and Kamouraska, the Parishes of St. Roch des Aulnets and St. Jean Port Joli, and the prolongation thereof in a straight line to the Province Line in the County of L'Islet."

Gulf

The Gulf Senate division is defined in the Consolidated Statutes of Canada (1859) as
"The Counties of Gaspé, Bonaventure and Rimouski."

Inkerman

The Inkerman Senate division is defined in the Consolidated Statutes of Canada (1859) as "The Counties of Argenteuil, Ottawa and Pontiac."

Kennebec

The Kennebec Senate division is defined in the Consolidated Statutes of Canada (1859) as "The Counties of Lotbinière, Mégantic and Arthabaska."

La Salle

The La Salle Senate division is defined in the Consolidated Statutes of Canada (1859) as "The remainder of the County of Quebec, the County of Portneuf, and all that part of the Banlieue of Quebec which likes within the Parish of Notre Dame de Quebec." The demarcation of the Laurentides Senate division provides an explanation of what constitutes the "remainder of the County of Quebec".

Lauzon

The Lauzon Senate division is defined in the Consolidated Statutes of Canada (1859) as "The remainder of the County of Lévi, the Counties of Dorchester and Beauce." The demarcation of the De la Durantaye Senate division provides an explanation of what constitutes the "remainder of the County of L'Islet".

Mille Isles

The Mille Isles Senate division is defined in the Consolidated Statutes of Canada (1859) as "The Counties of Terrebonne and Two Mountains."

Montarville

The Montarville Senate division is defined in the Consolidated Statutes of Canada (1859) as "The Counties of Verchères, Chambly and Laprairie."

Repentigny

The Repentigny Senate division is defined in the Consolidated Statutes of Canada (1859) as "The Parish of St. Paul, the Township of Kildare and its augmentation, and the Township of Cathcart, in the County of Joliette, the Counties of L'Assomption and Montcalm."

Rigaud

The Rigaud Senate division is defined in the Consolidated Statutes of Canada (1859) as "The remainder of the Parish of Montreal, and the Counties of Jacques Cartier, Vaudreuil and Solanges." The demarcation of the Alma Senate division provides an explanation of what constitutes the "remainder of the Parish of Montreal".

Rougemont

The Rougemont Senate division is defined in the Consolidated Statutes of Canada (1859) as "The remainder of the County of St. Hyacinth, the Counties of Rouville and Iberville." The demarcation of the Saurel Senate division provides an explanation of what constitutes "the remainder of the County of St. Hyacinth".

Saurel

The Saurel Senate division is defined in the Consolidated Statutes of Canada (1859) as "The Counties of Richelieu and Bagot, the Parishes of St. Denis, La Présentation, St. Barnabé, and St. Jude, in the County of St. Hyacinth."

Shawinegan

The Shawinegan Senate division is defined in the Consolidated Statutes of Canada (1859) as "The Counties of Champlain and St. Maurice, the Town of Three Rivers, the Parishes of River du Loup, St. Léon, St. Paulin, and the Township of Hunterstown and its augmentation, in the County of Maskinongé."

Stadacona

The Stadacona Senate division is defined in the Consolidated Statutes of Canada (1859) as "The remainder of the City and Banlieue of Quebec." The demarcation of the La Salle Senate division provides an explanation of what constitutes the "remainder of the City...of Quebec".

The Laurentides

The Senate division of The Laurentides is defined in the Consolidated Statutes of Canada (1859) as "The Counties of Chicoutimi, Charlevoix, Saguenay and Montmorency, the Seigniory of Beauport, the Parish of Charlebourg, the Townships of Stoneham and Tewkesbury, in the County of Quebec."

Victoria

The Victoria Senate division is defined in the Consolidated Statutes of Canada (1859) as "The remainder of the City of Montreal exclusive of the Parish." The demarcation of the Alma Senate division provides an explanation of what constitutes the "remainder of the city of Montreal".

Notes:

Wellington

The Wellington Senate division is defined in the Consolidated Statutes of Canada (1859) as "The remainder of the County of Drummond, the County of Richmond, the Town of Sherbrooke, the Counties of Wolfe, Compton, and Stanstead." The demarcation of the De la Vallière Senate division provides an explanation of what constitutes the "remainder of the County of Drummond".

See also
Lists of Canadian senators
Canadian Senate divisions

References

External links
Map of Quebec Senate divisions
Canada's senators, Parliament of Canada website

Quebec
Senators